The réserve de parc national des Monts-de-Puvirnituq is a protected area located in the administrative region of Nord-du-Québec, in Quebec, in Canada. The  territory is located northwest of Akulivik.

The Puvirnituq Mountains are a chain of parallel hills formed by the successive folding of the earth's crust.

Fauna and flora 

The national park reserve is one of few areas in Quebec where polar bears give birth to their young. It is also the only whistling swan nesting area in Quebec. The park is also frequented by a herd of caribou from the Rivière aux Feuilles.

See also 
 Nunavik
 National Parks of Quebec

Notes and references 

IUCN Category II
National parks of Quebec
Protected areas of Nord-du-Québec